Li Bing (born 16 March 1969 in Guizhou) is a retired Chinese international football player and currently a manager.

In his playing career he represented Liaoning, Guangdong Hongyuan, Sichuan Quanxing and a short loan period with German side Kickers Offenbach. Internationally Li represented China within the 1992 and 1996 AFC Asian Cup before he retired and moved into coaching where he received his first head coach position with Chengdu Blades.

Club career
As a youngster, Li was quickly picked up by the Chinese under-23 football team and with them, he was allowed to take part in the Chinese football league pyramid where they called themselves China B. He would actually see them win the Chinese league title in the 1989 league season before he had to return to his parent club Liaoning. Upon his return to Liaoning it would coincide with full professionalism and this would seem to bring out the best from him when he went on to personally win the 1994 Chinese Football Association Footballer of the Year award. This would see him as one of the most sought after players within China and big-money move to top tier side Guangdong Hongyuan F.C. where he was brought in to help with them with their title push, however, while they were close they only finished 4th in the 1995 league season. Unable to improve upon their performances the following season when they finished a disappointing 7th, Li Bing would be sold to Sichuan Guancheng. With them he was able to find a team capable of consistently fighting for the league title, however, the best they were able to achieve was 3rd position in the 1999 league season.

International goals

Management career
Li Bing would guide Chengdu Blades F.C. to promotion to the Chinese Super League after coming in during the 2007 league season, where he guided them to second in the league in the second tier. While he led Chengdu to relative safety throughout the 2008 league season, he led them to a terrible start in 2009 and resigned only six games into the season. He also became the caretaking manager of Guangzhou R&F twice.

Honours

Player

China B
Chinese Jia-A League: 1989

References

External links
 Player News at Sports.sina.com.cn 
 

1960 births
Living people
Chinese footballers
People from Guiyang
Footballers from Guizhou
China international footballers
Kickers Offenbach players
Expatriate footballers in Germany
Chinese expatriate footballers
Chinese football managers
1992 AFC Asian Cup players
1996 AFC Asian Cup players
Chinese expatriate sportspeople in Germany
Guangdong Winnerway F.C. players
Liaoning F.C. players
Sichuan Guancheng players
Asian Games silver medalists for China
Medalists at the 1994 Asian Games
Asian Games medalists in football
Association football forwards
Sichuan Longfor F.C. managers
Guangzhou City F.C. managers
Footballers at the 1994 Asian Games
Guangzhou City F.C. non-playing staff